Crenea is a genus of flowering plants belonging to the family Lythraceae.

Its native range is Trinidad to Southern Tropical America.

Species:

Crenea maritima 
Crenea patentinervis

References

Lythraceae
Lythraceae genera